Fakhrul Islam Khan (known as FI Khan; 9 February 1925 – 13 May 2007) was a Bangladeshi editor, journalist, cultural organizer, playwright, producer, and director. He was the editor of Gulista (1950), a monthly Bengali magazine, and Kadem (1966), a weekly magazine. He was the joint news editor with Shah Azizur Rahman of the monthly magazine Inqilab (published from Kolkata).  Khan has made a special contribution to Barisal's cultural activities, cultural heritage, literary councils, journalism and Barisal Press Club. He was the first Bengal Muslim film producer. He established Barisal Natya Niketan in 1964.

Early life and education
Khan was born on 9 February 1925, to Bengali Muslim parents Hashem Ali Khan and Samisun Nesa in Barisal. The family hailed from the village of Sehangal in Swarupkathi, Firozpur. His father was a social worker, politician, and member of the cabinet led by Sher-e-Bangla A K Fazlul Huq in 1941. Khan started his education at AK School in Barisal and later was admitted to Ripon School & College in Kolkata. He led several student movements. He was the editor of a magazine in Ripon School, for which he also wrote.

Career

Khan was a journalist, and a film producer and director. His production company is Kolkata Azad Chitrapat. In 1944 Purabasha, Kalocaya, Hanabari and Jago Hua Sabera were released by his production. The director of these films was Premendra Mitra, with Khan as joint director. In 1947, the film received the Best Film Award. Hospital was released under the Bulbul Production Banner in 1956. During this time he was elected as the joint secretary of Kolkata Motion Pictures Association and joint editor of Kolkata Writer Journalist Sangha. His production began in Ananya under the direction of film director Sushil Majumder in a joint venture in India in 1972. He was the founding editor of Barisal Sahitya Parishad. He was the editor of the monthly Gulista, weekly Khadem and Inqilab.

Personal life
Khan was married to Syeda Sakina Islam, a former member of Jatiya Sangsad. The couple has one son, Amirul Islam Khan Bulbul; and two daughters, Shabnam Wadud Kaya and Saguafa Khanam Joardar.

References 

1925 births
2007 deaths
Bangladeshi journalists
Bangladeshi directors
Bangladeshi film producers
20th-century journalists
20th-century Bengalis
People from Pirojpur District